The Sin and Doom Vol. II is the sixth studio album by American Christian deathcore band Impending Doom. The album was released on June 22, 2018. The title of the album is a reference to Impending Doom's first demo release, The Sin and Doom of Godless Men, released in 2005. The band members produced the album in a more hands-on style than their previous releases, with the assistance of Christopher Eck who produced Nailed. Dead. Risen.

Critical reception

The album received limited but generally positive reviews. Of the reviews collected, New Noise gave the album a perfect 5 out of 5, stating: "Trying to poke flaws in this album would just be fruitless work, for Impending Doom has successfully put together the best metal LP of the year so far." Giving the album 3.5 out of 5 stars, HM Magazine noted that: "the new album surely won't disappoint fans of the band's catalog, even though it doesn't quite illustrate a deliberate personal relationship with Jesus as Nailed. Dead. Risen." Amber Stevens of Metal Injection, giving the album 6 out of 10, described it as "damn well punishing enough for even the most critical, die-hard fans of the genre" and "a straight-forward, heavy hitting assault of the senses".

Track listing

Personnel
Impending Doom
 Brook Reeves – vocals, composition, engineering
 Manny Contreras – lead guitar, production, composition, engineering
 Eric Correa – rhythm guitar, production, composition, engineering
 David Sittig – bass, engineering
 Brandon Trahan – drums, engineering

Additional personnel
 Christopher Eck – production, engineering, mixing, tracking
 Joe Butler – photography

References

2018 albums
Impending Doom albums
E1 Music albums